The A194 road is a road in Tyne and Wear, England. It runs northeast from its start at junction 65 of the A1(M) near Washington, and the first  are motorway standard, designated the A194(M). There are intermediate junctions with the A182 and the A195 before the motorway section ends at the A184 junction. The junctions were unnumbered until 2013 when they were designated J1 to J3.

The A194 continues as a trunk road to its next major junction, the A19 which provides access to the Tyne Tunnel, Sunderland and Teesside. At this point, A194 ceases to be a trunk road and continues to its terminus in South Shields town centre. The A194(M) was renamed A1(M) and then renamed back, the only motorway to be renamed back to its original name.

A194(M)

Motorway junctions

See also 
List of motorways in the United Kingdom

References

External links
 CBRD Motorway Database – A194(M)
 Pathetic Motorways – A194(M)
 The Motorway Archive – A194(M)

Transport in Tyne and Wear
Roads in Tyne and Wear
Roads in South Shields
Motorways in England